Rassco (neighborhood)
 Rassco (company)